The R1 Plasmid is a plasmid that was first isolated from Salmonella paratyphi bacteria in 1963. It is a short plasmid, composed of 97,566 nucleotides and 120 genes, that belongs to the IncFII plasmid group.

The R1 plasmid imparts multi-drug antibiotic resistance to its host bacteria.

It's known as a "low copy" plasmid, meaning that it exists in relatively few copies in any given bacteria. This characteristic allows the R1 plasmid to have an efficient plasmid stabilization system, that aids in stabilizing medium copy number plasmids. R1 must rely on "Type II" segregation system. This plasmid system ensures that at least one copy is contained in each daughter cell after cell division.

Partitioning System 
The R1 plasmid partitioning is a mechanism needed for the inheritance of the R1 plasmid. The par system is composed of the ParR and the parC regions, that interact together. The par system determines the position of the replicon, ensuring that at the end of DNA Replication, the plasmid copies are well-positioned to start cell division. The par system also allows for the initiation of  ParM formation. ParM produces two important cytoskeletal proteins, MreB, and actin. ParM is directed to move the plasmid copies to opposite cell poles. Cell division takes place, resulting in the partitioned plasmids in two daughter cells.  

Some genes on the R1 plasmid are:
ParM is a prokaryotic actin homologue which provides the force to drive copies of the R1 plasmid to opposite ends of rod shaped bacteria before division.
The Hok/sok system a post-segregational killing system of the plasmid.
CopA-like RNA, an antisense RNA involved in replication control of the plasmid.

References

Plasmids